Potarje is a South Slavic toponym, which may refer to: 

Potarje, Montenegro, the native name for the region of Tara River Valley, Montenegro
Potarje, Serbia, the native name for the region of Tara mountain, Serbia
Potarje, Tržič, a settlement in the Municipality of Tržič, Slovenia